Lindsay Elise Jones (née Tuggey; born September 6, 1989) is an American actor, director, gamer and host.

Life and career
Jones was born and raised in Dallas, Texas. They attended, and graduated, the University of Texas at Austin. While acting at the University of Texas, they used the stage name of Lindsay Kavlin.

Jones later joined Rooster Teeth Productions, where they spent much of their time working on videos in the Achievement Hunter division. They were a director, writer and voice actor on X-Ray and Vav, a cartoon series by Rooster Teeth. Additionally, Jones was the primary manager of Rooster Teeth's video gaming website Achievement Hunter, and has appeared in many other Rooster Teeth productions such as Ten Little Roosters and On the Spot. In April 2012, they were added to the cast of three-time Podcast Award winner Internet Box.

Jones married their long-time boyfriend Michael Jones on May 9, 2014. During Rooster Teeth's 2016 Extra Life livestream, the couple announced that they were expecting a daughter, due in June 2017. Iris Elise Jones was born on May 24, 2017. At RTX 2018, Jones announced that they were expecting a second child due in February 2019. Luna Claire Jones was born February 18, 2019.

In 2019, they hosted the SXSW Gaming Awards. In December 2020, Jones stated that they prefer they/them pronouns, though they are "okay with" she/her pronouns.

Filmography

References

External links 

 
 

1989 births
Living people
Actors from Austin, Texas
American animated film directors
American voice actresses
American web series actors
Animators from Texas
Rooster Teeth people
Twitch (service) streamers
Screenwriters from Texas
University of Texas at Austin alumni
LGBT people from Texas
Writers from Austin, Texas
21st-century American actors
21st-century American screenwriters
21st-century LGBT people
American non-binary actors